Babuneh may refer to:
 Babuneh-ye Olya, East Azerbaijan Province
 Babuneh-ye Sofla, East Azerbaijan Province
 Babuneh-ye Vosta, East Azerbaijan Province
 Babuneh, Kohgiluyeh and Boyer-Ahmad